Alexander Lvovich Zuev (born 4 October 1996) is a Russian basketball player for the Russian 3x3 national team.

He was born in 1996 in Berezniki. At the age of twelve he moved to Perm, where he played in the club "Olimpiets" with which he twice won silver medals of the Russian championship.

In 2012 he was invited to the youth team of the club "Khimki", in his first season with the team won the national championship and took second place in the European Youth Basketball League. Zuev had even better season with Khimki: He received gold awards of Youth Basketball League and European Youth Basketball League (U20).

Combined basketball and 3x3 basketball and at some point in his career, opted for the latter. Moved to the club "Gagarin" Zuev became 2-time winner of Russian Cup and 2020 Russian Champion. Soon won a place in the main roster of the national 3x3 basketball team.

He represented Russian Olympic Committee (ROC) at the 2020 Summer Olympics.

References

External links
 
 
 
 
 

1996 births
Living people
3x3 basketball players at the 2020 Summer Olympics
Medalists at the 2020 Summer Olympics
Olympic medalists in 3x3 basketball
Olympic 3x3 basketball players of Russia
People from Berezniki
Russian men's basketball players
Russian men's 3x3 basketball players
Olympic silver medalists for the Russian Olympic Committee athletes
Sportspeople from Perm Krai